Henrich Benčík (born 4 October 1978) is a Slovak former professional footballer who played as a forward.. He spent a large part of his career playing in Germany.

Career
In winter 2013, he returned to hometown club FC Nitra.

References

External links
 
 
 

Living people
1978 births
Sportspeople from Nitra
Slovak footballers
Association football forwards
Slovakia international footballers
FC Nitra players
FC Petržalka players
FK Teplice players
Denizlispor footballers
Rot Weiss Ahlen players
1. FC Saarbrücken players
SC Freiburg players
FSV Frankfurt players
VfL Osnabrück players
SV Wacker Burghausen players
Slovak Super Liga players
Czech First League players
Süper Lig players
2. Bundesliga players
3. Liga players
Slovak expatriate footballers
Slovak expatriate sportspeople in Turkey
Expatriate footballers in Turkey
Slovak expatriate sportspeople in Germany
Expatriate footballers in Germany